The Los Angeles Aqueduct system, comprising the Los Angeles Aqueduct (Owens Valley aqueduct) and the Second Los Angeles Aqueduct, is a water conveyance system, built and operated by the Los Angeles Department of Water and Power. The Owens Valley aqueduct was designed and built by the city's water department, at the time named The Bureau of Los Angeles Aqueduct, under the supervision of the department's Chief Engineer William Mulholland. The system delivers water from the Owens River in the Eastern Sierra Nevada Mountains to Los Angeles.

The aqueduct's construction was controversial from the start, as water diversions to Los Angeles eliminated the Owens Valley as a viable farming community. Clauses in the city's charter originally stated that the city could not sell or provide surplus water to any area outside the city, forcing adjacent communities to annex themselves into Los Angeles.

The aqueduct's infrastructure also included the completion of the St. Francis Dam in 1926 to provide storage in case of disruption to the system. The dam's collapse two years later killed at least 431 people, halted the rapid pace of annexation, and eventually led to the formation of the Metropolitan Water District of Southern California to build and operate the Colorado River Aqueduct to bring water from the Colorado River to Los Angeles County.

The continued operation of the Los Angeles Aqueduct has led to public debate, legislation, and court battles over its environmental impacts on Mono Lake and other ecosystems.

First Los Angeles Aqueduct

Construction
The aqueduct project began in 1905 when the voters of Los Angeles approved a  bond for the 'purchase of lands and water and the inauguration of work on the aqueduct'.

Construction began in 1908 and was divided into eleven divisions. The city acquired three limestone quarries, two Tufa quarries and it constructed and operated a cement plant in Monolith, California, which could produce 1,200 barrels of Portland cement per day. Regrinding mills were also built and operated by the city at the tufa quarries. To move 14 million ton-miles of freight, the city contracted with Southern Pacific to build a 118 mile long rail system from the Monolith mills to Olancha.

The number of men who were on the payroll the first year was 2,629 and this number peaked at 6,060 in May 1909. In 1910, employment dropped to 1,150 due to financial reasons but rebounded later in the year. Between 1911 and 1912 employment ranged from 2,800 to 3,800 workers. The number of laborers working on the aqueduct at its peak was 3,900. In 1913, the City of Los Angeles completed construction of the first Los Angeles Aqueduct.

Route
This reservoir was later renamed the Lower Van Norman Reservoir.

The aqueduct uses gravity alone to move the water and also uses the water to generate electricity, which makes it cost-efficient to operate.

Reactions by impacted communities

The construction of the Los Angeles Aqueduct effectively eliminated the Owens Valley as a viable farming community and eventually devastated the Owens Lake ecosystem. A group labeled the "San Fernando Syndicate" – including Fred Eaton, Mulholland, Harrison Otis (the publisher of The Los Angeles Times), Henry Huntington (an executive of the Pacific Electric Railroad), and other wealthy individuals – were a group of investors who bought land in the San Fernando Valley allegedly based on inside knowledge that the Los Angeles aqueduct would soon irrigate it and encourage development. Although there is disagreement over the actions of the "syndicate" as to whether they were a "diabolical" cabal or only a group that united the Los Angeles business community behind supporting the aqueduct, Eaton, Mulholland and others connected with the project have long been accused of using deceptive tactics and underhanded methods to obtain water rights and block the Bureau of Reclamation from building water infrastructure for the residents in Owens Valley, and create a false sense of urgency around the completion of the aqueduct for Los Angeles residents.
By the 1920s, the aggressive pursuits of the water rights and the diversion of the Owens River precipitated the outbreak of violence known as the California water wars. Farmers in Owens Valley, following a series of unmet deadlines from LADWP, attacked infrastructure, dynamiting the aqueduct numerous times and opening sluice gates to divert the flow of water back into lakes, namely Owens Lake. The lake has never been refilled, and is now maintained with a minimum level of surface water to prevent the aggravation of dangerous toxic lake-floor dust into the local community.

St. Francis Dam failure 

In 1917, The Bureau of Los Angeles Aqueduct sought to build a holding reservoir to regulate flow, provide hydroelectric power, and storage in case of disruption to the aqueduct system. The initial site chosen was in Long Valley, east of the Owens River, but Eaton, who had bought up much of the valley in anticipation of the need for a reservoir, refused to sell the land at the price offered by Los Angeles. Mulholland then made the decision to move the reservoir to San Francisquito Canyon above what is now Santa Clarita, California. The resulting St. Francis Dam was completed in 1926 and created a reservoir capacity of 38,000 acre-feet (47,000,000 m3). On March 12, 1928, the dam catastrophically failed, sending a  wall of water down the canyon, ultimately reaching the Pacific Ocean near Ventura and Oxnard, and killing at least 431 people. The resulting investigation and trial led to the retirement of William Mulholland as the head of the Los Angeles Bureau of Water Works and Supply in 1929. The dam failure is the worst man-made flood disaster in the US in the 20th century and the second largest single-event loss of life in California history after the 1906 San Francisco earthquake.

Mono Basin Extension
In an effort to find more water, the city of Los Angeles reached farther north. In 1930, Los Angeles voters passed a third  bond to buy land in the Mono Basin and fund the Mono Basin extension. The  extension diverted flows from the Rush Creek, Lee Vining Creek, Walker and Parker Creeks that would have flowed into Mono Lake.

Completed in 1940, diversions began in 1941. Full appropriation of the water could not be met until the second aqueduct was completed in 1970.

The Mono Extension's impact on Mono Basin and litigation 
These export levels severely impacted the region's fish habitat, lake level and air quality, which led to a series of lawsuits.

Second Los Angeles Aqueduct

In 1956, the State Department of Water Resources reported that Los Angeles was only exporting  of water of the  available in the Owens Valley and Mono Basin. Three years later, the State Water Rights Board warned Los Angeles that they could lose rights to the water they were permitted for but not appropriating. Faced with the possible loss of future water supply, Los Angeles began the five-year construction of the aqueduct in 1965 at a cost US$89 million. Once the city received diversion permits, water exports jumped in 1970, adding 110,000 AF that year into the aqueduct system. Unlike the First Aqueduct which was built entirely by Public Works, the Second Los Angeles Aqueduct was primarily built on contract by various private construction firms including R.A. Wattson Co., Winston Bros., and the Griffith Co. The Los Angeles Department of Water and Power managed the project and performed some finishing construction on the Mojave conduit and Jawbone & Dove Spring pipelines.

Route
The  aqueduct was designed to flow  and begins at the Merritt Diversion Structure at the junction of the North and South Haiwee Reservoirs, south of Owens Lake, and runs roughly parallel to the first aqueduct.

The Second Aqueduct was not built as a single contiguous conduit. For design and construction purposes the aqueduct was divided into Northern and Southern sections and the two are connected by the San Francisquito Tunnels, which are part of the First Aqueduct.

The Northern Section carries water starting at the North Haiwee Reservoir through the Haiwee Bypass passing around the South Haiwee Reservoir.

Once the combined flow reaches the penstocks above Power Plant #2, water is diverted into the Southern Section of the second aqueduct away through the Drinkwater Tunnel to the Drinkwater Reservoir.

The last segment of pipe, known as the Saugus Pipeline, carries water south past Bouquet Canyon, Soledad Canyon and Placerita Canyon in the city of Santa Clarita. From there it roughly parallels Sierra Highway before it enters Magazine Canyon towards the Terminal structure and Cascades.  Water from the Terminal structure can then flow to either the Cascade or penstock to the Foothill Power Plant and into the Upper Van Norman Reservoir.

In addition to the construction in the Northern and Southern sections, improvements were also made to the lined canal between the Alabama Gates and the North Haiwee Reservoir in the Northern Section that consisted of adding  sidewalls to both sides of the canal and the raising of overcrosses.

Second aqueduct's impact on the water system

The increased flows provided by the second aqueduct lasted only from 1971 through 1988. In 1974 the environmental consequences of the higher exports were first being recognized in the Mono Basin and Owens Valley. This was followed by a series of court ordered restrictions imposed on water exports, which resulted in Los Angeles losing water. In 2005, the Los Angeles Urban Water Management Report reported that 40–50% of the aqueduct's historical supply is now devoted to ecological resources in Mono and Inyo counties.

Influence on Los Angeles and the county
Between 1909 and 1928, the city of Los Angeles grew from 61 square miles to 440 square miles. This was due largely to the aqueduct, and the city's charter was worded such that it stated the City of Los Angeles could not sell or provide surplus water to any area outside the city.
Outlying areas relied on wells and creeks for water and, as they dried up, the people in those areas realized that if they were going to be able to continue irrigating their farms and provide themselves domestic water, they would have to annex themselves to the City of Los Angeles.

Growth was so rapid that it appeared as if the city of Los Angeles would eventually assume the size of the entire county. William Mulholland continued adding capacity to the aqueduct, building the St. Francis Dam that would impound the waters creating the San Francisquito Reservoir, filed for additional water on the Colorado River and he began sending engineers and miners to clear the heading at the San Jacinto Tunnel that he knew was key to the construction of the Colorado River Aqueduct.

The aqueduct's water provided developers with the resources to quickly develop the San Fernando Valley and Los Angeles through World War II. Mulholland's role in the vision and completion of the aqueduct and the growth of Los Angeles into a large metropolis is recognized with the William Mulholland Memorial Fountain, built in 1940 at Riverside Drive and Los Feliz Boulevard in Los Feliz. Mulholland Drive and Mulholland Dam are both named after him.

Many more cities and unincorporated areas would likely have annexed into the city of Los Angeles if the St. Francis Dam had not collapsed. The catastrophic failure of the St. Francis Dam in 1928 killed an estimated 431 people, flooded parts of Santa Clarita, and devastated much of the Santa Clara River Valley in Ventura County.

The failure of the dam raised the question in a number of people's minds whether the city had engineering competence and capability to manage such a large project as the Colorado River Aqueduct despite the fact that they had built the Los Angeles Aqueduct. After the collapse, the pace of annexation came to a rapid halt when eleven nearby cities including Burbank, Glendale, Pasadena, Beverly Hills, San Marino, Santa Monica, Anaheim, Colton, Santa Ana, and San Bernardino decided to form the Metropolitan Water District with Los Angeles. The city's growth following the formation of the MWD would be limited to 27.65 square miles.

In popular culture
 Saugus High School derives the name of its daily newsletter, The Pipeline, from an exposed portion of the first aqueduct that passes southwest of the school's property.
 San Francisquito Canyon and DWP Power House #1 are featured in Visiting... with Huell Howser Episode 424.

California Historical Landmark – Cascades 
The Cascades, which was completed on November 5, 1913, is located near the intersection of Foothill Boulevard and Balboa Boulevard, four miles northwest of San Fernando. It was designated as a California Historical Landmark on July 28, 1958.

Gallery

See also
 American Water Landmark
 California Aqueduct
 Colorado River Aqueduct
 State Water Project
 Owensmouth

References
Notes

Further reading

External links

 LADWP: official  Los Angeles Aqueduct website
 UCLA: Los Angeles Aqueduct Digital Platform
 Los Angeles Aqueduct Landscape Atlas
 Mono Lake Committee Website
 LADWP: History page on William Mulholland
 Los Angeles Aqueduct Slideshow
 The William Mulholland Memorial Fountain
 Image of workers making repairs on a damaged section of the Los Angeles Aqueduct in No-Name Canyon, Inyo County vicinity, [about 1927].  Los Angeles Times Photographic Archive (Collection 1429). UCLA Library Special Collections, Charles E. Young Research Library, University of California, Los Angeles.
 

 
 
 
 
 
 
 
 
 
 
 
 
 
 
 
 
 
 
 
 
 
 
 
 
 
 
 
 
 
 
 
 
 
 
 
 
 
 
 
 

 
Aqueducts in California
Interbasin transfer
Water in California
Aqueduct
Aqueduct
History of the San Fernando Valley
History of Inyo County, California
History of Mono County, California
Owens Valley
Sierra Nevada (United States)
Transportation buildings and structures in Inyo County, California
Transportation buildings and structures in Kern County, California
Transportation buildings and structures in Los Angeles County, California
Transportation buildings and structures in Mono County, California
Buildings and structures in the San Fernando Valley
Historic American Buildings Survey in California
Historic American Engineering Record in California
Historic Civil Engineering Landmarks
Los Angeles Historic-Cultural Monuments
1913 establishments in California
Hydroelectric power plants in California